Belle and Sebastian is an animated children's television series, an adaptation of the 1965 novel of the same name by Cécile Aubry. A Canada-France international co-production, the series was produced by the Montreal-based Groupe PVP and France's Gaumont Animation.

Plot
When Sebastian, a young orphan living in the Alps, meets Belle, a huge white Great Pyrenees, they set off together on a series of fantastic adventures around the mountains.

Characters
 Sebastian (voiced by Angela Galuppo) is a young orphan. He is a stubborn but brave part of the Mountaineers.
 Belle is a huge white Great Pyreness.
 Cameron (voiced by Jessica Kardos) is Sebastian's frenemy, and Gabriel's friend.
 Gabriel (voiced by Sonja Ball) is Cameron's friend.
 Caspar (voiced by Terrence Scammell) is Angelina and Sebastian's grandfather.
 Anton (voiced by Arthur Holden) is the main antagonist of the series who always tries to capture Belle.
 Angelina (voiced by Brittany Drisdelle) is Sebastian's older sister and mother figure.
 Roberta (voiced by Sonja Ball) is Cameron's mother. Angelina describes her as a tough cookie.
 Mr. Damien is Cameron's father. 
 Ivan (voiced by Vlasta Vrána)
 Victor is a student with asthma who often likes to visit Sonny and Adele. He appeared in "The Beauty and the Pug".
 Madeline (voiced by Jessica Kardos)
 Maurice
 Elaina (voiced by Stephanie Buxton) is the mother of Sonny and Adele, and the mayor of the village. She doesn't like Belle.
 Adele (voiced by Angela Galuppo) is the older sister of Sonny. As of "On Cold Terms", she is Sebastian's best human friend.
 Megan is one of the students at the school.
 Yuki is Gabriel's pet dog.
 Professor Turner (voiced by Matthew Gagnon) is a teacher at the school.
 Dr. William (voiced by Mark Camacho)
 Sonny (voiced by Eleanor Noble) is a sometimes clumsy boy who is the younger brother of Adele.
 Lynette (voiced by Holly Gauthier-Frankel) is a student at the school.
 Pierrette (voiced by Holly Gauthier-Frankel)
 Martin (voiced by Rick Jones)
 Mitch (voiced by Julian Casey) is the fearless, Everest winner of the Silver Ice Axe.
 Franck (voiced by Thor Bishopric) is a mountain climber.

Production
In September 2015, Gaumont Animation was developing an animated series based on Cécile Aubry's novel Belle et Sébastien. Later that month, Montreal-based Groupe PVP formed a coproduction partnership with Gaumont on two animated series, including Belle, and the production began in 2016.

The show was produced for a consortium of broadcasters, including Ici Radio-Canada Télé and Knowledge Network in Canada, M6 and Piwi + in France, ZDF in Germany, VRT in Belgium, and RTS in Switzerland.

Episodes 
 The White Dragon
 The Curious Kid
 The Wild Mountaineers
 Race Against the Train
 Fearless Sonny
 Mountain School
 Trapped
 The Secret Passage
 The New Cameron
 The Promise
 The Fear in Fearless
 Jealous
 The Beauty and the Pug
 Mayhem At the Inn
 Vote Belle!
 Picture-Perfect Village
 The Faded Mount
 The Pact
 The Great Bow Shelter
 Belle, the Sheepdog
 No Name Peak
 The Great Nordic Race
 The Angelina Mission
 On Cold Terms
 Sick as a Dog
 Caspar's Journal
 Sealed Lips
 The White Bear
 The Black Eagle
 The Mountain Fire
 Home is Where the Heart Is
 At the Top
 Chore Day
 The Presentation
 The First Meeting, The Runaway (Part 1)
 The First Meeting, The Hunt (Part 2)
 Lucky Star
 Beautiful Memories
 Werewolf
 Sebastian's Vertigo
 The Invisible Threat
 The Attack
 The Great Drought
 Adele's Bracelet
 The Happy Shelter Needs Work
 Oh My Mom
 The Little Mountain Guide
 Parasites
 Angelina's Secret
 The Desperate Chamois
 The Saint-Martin Amulet
 Vitamin

Broadcast
The series first began airing on Ici Radio-Canada Télé on September 9, 2017. It premiered in France on M6 on October 9 the same year. In the United States, the series began airing on TiVi5MONDE on June 13, 2018 and later in Germany, it premiered on KiKa on September 22.

The show had its English language debut on Knowledge Network on October 7, 2017. In Singapore, it began airing on Channel 5's Okto block on June 7, 2019. Belle and Sebastian also aired on Nick Jr in Australia and CITV in United Kingdom.

References

2010s Canadian animated television series
2010s French animated television series
2017 French television series debuts
2017 Canadian television series debuts
2019 French television series endings
2019 Canadian television series endings
Canadian children's animated adventure television series
Canadian children's animated comedy television series
Canadian children's animated drama television series
Canadian flash animated television series
English-language television shows
French children's animated adventure television series
French children's animated comedy television series
French children's animated drama television series
French flash animated television series
French-language television shows
Gaumont Animation
Animated television series about dogs
Animated television series about orphans